Chia-Hui Lu is a Taiwanese classical pianist.

Lu is active in the cultural arts community in Taiwan.  She is the chairwoman of the Egret Foundation, a non-profit organization that promotes Taiwan culture and arts.  She is a faculty member of the National Taiwan University of Arts and the Affiliated Senior High School of National Taiwan Normal University. For her album Enchanted  she transcribed Isaac Albeniz's Tango in D. For her album Amore, Lu composed Butterfly Orchid.

Classical music performances
Lu is a classical pianist by training and has played concerts in several countries.  In New York City, Lu has performed recitals at Weill Recital Hall at Carnegie Hall, and Alice Tully Hall at Lincoln Center.  In Europe, Lu performed at the Rome National Music Festival and Vasto Italy Festival.  She also performed a recital in Barletta, Italy.

In Taiwan, Lu performed "An Evening of Fantasy with the Taipei Metropolitan Symphony Orchestra, "Care for Taiwan's Land Restoration Concert" - Robert Schumann's Concerto in A Minor with Philharmonia Moment Musical, "Sound Of Formosa" - the Piano Concerto premiere of Gordon Shi-Wen Chin with the National Symphony Orchestra, and "Evening of Dance" - Piano Recital, among others.

Multimedia works
Lu's Amore multimedia work  mixed a classical recital with animation created from Paul Chiang's paintings. Her "Water on Fire" piano recital  combined Western classical music with Eastern poetry from a Taiwan poet, Goya Lan.  Lu curated artwork from over thirty seven artists at the Art Taipei exhibition. She was later invited to perform at the opening ceremony of Art Taipei 2020, and at the Diversonics Festival 2021. She also curated the Sacred Garden at the international Ars Electronica Festival in 2021.

Lu was the Music Director for Sayion I  and Sayion II, which incorporated music with dancers that are suited up in sensors that controlled the visual background.  In collaboration with IF+, Lu produced "Obsession", employing various immersive technologies including virtual reality (VR), augmented reality (AR) and mixed reality (MR), all under the umbrella of XR extended reality.

Awards
 1987, First prize winner of the Taipei seventy-sixth solo piano music competition
 1990, Winner of the seventy-eighth Junior solo piano music competition at the Southern District of Taipei
 1991, Winner of the eightieth youth piano solo music competition in the Southern District of Taipei
 2000, Winner of the 28th Anniversary International's Young Artists Award
 2003, Winner of the 30th Anniversary International's Young Artists Outstanding Alumni Award
 2021, Winner, Silver, of the MUSE Design Award to the Egret Foundation, for "AMORE"
 2021, Winner, Silver, of the MUSE Silver Design Award to the Egret Foundation, for "Impression of Taiwan"
 2021, Special Mention of the German Design Award for "Impression of Taiwan"
 2021, Winner of the ICONIC Awards for "Impression of Taiwan"
 2021, Honorable Mention of the International Design Awards for "AMORE"
 2021, Honorable Mention of the International Design Awards for "Butterfly Orchid"
 2021, Honorable Mention of the international Design Awards for "Impression of Taiwan"
 2021, Shortlist of London International Creative Competition for "Butterfly Orchid"
 2021, Winner of the New York Film Awards (Best Song, Best Music Video, Best Animation) for "Butterfly Orchid"
 2021, Winner of the Toronto International Women Film Festival (Best Female Composer) for "Butterfly Orchid"
 2021,  Honorable Mention for Sound Design at the Los Angeles Film Awards for "Butterfly Orchid"
 2021, Winner of the MUSE Design Award, Conceptual Design for "Butterfly Orchid"
 2021, Winner of the DNA Paris Design Awards, Graphic Design/Colorful Project for "Butterfly Orchid"
 2021, Official Selection for The Fine Arts Film Festival, "Butterfly Orchid"
 2021, Official selection, St. Louis International Film Festival, SLIFF/Kids Family Shorts 1, "Butterfly Orchid"
 2021, Winner of A' Design Awards for "Amore"
 2021, Winner of the DNA Paris Design Awards for "XR Obsession"
 2021, Winner of the MUSE Creative Award for "XR Obsession"
 2021, Winner of the Global Film Festival Awards (Best Documentary & Best Sound Design) for "Beauty of Taiwan"
 2021, Honorable Mention for Documentary Short at the Festigious International Film Festival  for "Beauty of Taiwan"
 2022, Winner of the New York Independent Cinema Awards (Best Composer) for "XR Obsession"
 2022, Official Selection for the Berlin Short Film Festival, "Butterfly Orchid"
 2022, Winner of the New York International Film Awards (Best Song & Grand Jury Award) for "XR Obsession"
 2022, Winner of the Oniros Film Awards (Best Art Director) for "XR Obsession"
 2022, Winner of the Vegas Shorts Awards (Best Director & Composer) for "XR Obsession"
 2022, Honorable Mention for Score at the Top Shorts Awards for "XR Obsession"
 2022, Winner of Best Composer at the Chicago Indie Film Awards for "XR Obsession"
 2022, Winner Canadian Cinematography Awards for Best Sound "Beauty of Taiwan"

References

External links
 
 
 Profile at National Taiwan University of Arts Music Department

1976 births
Living people
Taiwanese classical pianists
21st-century classical pianists
Women classical pianists